Sant Sadurní may refer to:

People
 Saint Saturnin

Places in Catalonia
 Sant Sadurní d'Anoia
 Sant Sadurní de l'Heura, in the municipality of Cruïlles, Monells i Sant Sadurní de l'Heura
 Sant Sadurní d'Osormort
 Sant Sadurní de Rotgers, in the municipality of Borredà

See also
 Saint Saturninus (disambiguation)